Sparganothis mcguinnessi is a species of moth of the family Tortricidae. It is found in New York in the United States.

Etymology
The species is named in honor of Hugh McGuinness.

References

Moths described in 2012
Sparganothis